The Fourth Great Awakening was a Christian awakening that some scholars – most notably economic historian Robert Fogel – say took place in the United States in the late 1960s and early 1970s, while others look at the era following World War II. The terminology is controversial, with some historians believing the religious changes that took place in the US during these years were not equivalent to those of the first three great awakenings. Thus, the idea of a Fourth Great Awakening itself has not been generally accepted.

Whether or not they constitute an awakening, many changes did take place. The "mainline" Protestant churches weakened sharply in both membership and influence while the most conservative religious denominations (such as the Southern Baptists and Missouri Synod Lutherans) grew rapidly in numbers, spread across the United States, had grave internal theological battles and schisms, and became politically powerful. Other evangelical and fundamentalist denominations also expanded rapidly. At the same time, secularism grew dramatically, and the more conservative churches saw themselves battling secularism in terms of issues such as LGBT rights, abortion, and creationism.

New movements

Concomitant to the power shift was a change in evangelicalism itself, with new groups arising and extant ones switching their focus. There was a new emphasis on a personal relationship with Jesus from newly styled "non-denominational" churches and "community faith centers". This period also saw the rise of non-traditional churches and megachurches with conservative theologies and a growth in parachurch organizations while mainline Protestantism lost many members. The Jesus Movement is considered by some to be part of the Fourth Great Awakening.

Vinson Synan (1997) argues that a charismatic awakening occurred between 1961 and 1982. This stemmed from a Pentecostal movement that placed emphasis on experiencing what they saw as the gifts of the spirit, including speaking in tongues, healing, and prophecy. It also focused on strengthening spiritual convictions through these gifts and through signs taken to be from the Holy Spirit. Originally a Protestant movement, its influence spread to some in the Roman Catholic Church at a time when Catholic leaders were opening up to more ecumenical beliefs, to a reduced emphasis on institutional structures, and an increased emphasis on lay spirituality.

Trends
Organized religion in the United States changed in the face of secularizing pressures after World War II. There was a proliferation of megachurches. Denominations such as the Assemblies of God, Southern Baptists, and The Church of Jesus Christ of Latter-day Saints (Mormons) became more popular. Three particular religious leaders were very influential: Martin Luther King Jr., Billy Graham, and Pope John Paul II. Megachurches won attention for the simple reason that 10 churches with 2,000 members were more visible than 100 churches with 200 members. The populist denominations' growth coincided with the simultaneous decline of the mainline bodies. While the former trend did not come at the expense of the latter (it represented different fertility and retention rates, not switching), to the media and many ordinary observers those developments signaled the aggressive swelling of religious strength.

The "mainstream" Protestant churches contracted sharply in terms of membership and influence.

After World War II, some conservative Christian denominations (including the Southern Baptists, Missouri Synod Lutherans, the Church of God, Pentecostals, Holiness groups, and Nazarenes) grew rapidly in numbers and also spread nationwide. Some of these denominations, such as the Southern Baptists and Missouri Synod Lutherans, would go on to face theological battles and schisms from the 1960s onward (LCMS would see a split in the 1970s which would ultimately lead to the forming of the Evangelical Lutheran Church in America, while the SBC would face its own battles resulting in the Southern Baptist Convention conservative resurgence). Many of the more conservative churches would go on to become politically powerful as part of the "religious right". At the same time, the influence of secularism (the belief that government and law should not be based on religion) grew dramatically, and the more conservative churches saw themselves battling secularism in terms of issues such as gay rights, abortion, and creationism.

Byrnes and Segers note regarding the abortion issue, "While more theologically conservative Protestant denominations, such as the Missouri-Synod Lutherans and the Southern Baptist Convention, expressed disapproval of Roe, they became politically active only in the mid and late 1970s." The SBC itself actually passed resolutions at two Annual Meetings in support of legalized abortion; not until 1980 (in the early days of the Conservative Resurgence) would it reverse its position and, from that point on, continually adopt resolutions opposing it. However, the political involvement of churches ranged from actively participating in organizations such as the Moral Majority and the Christian Coalition to adopting the much more indirect and unorganized approach of Missouri Synod Lutherans.

See also

Apostolic-Prophetic Movement
Christianity and politics
Consciousness Revolution
Culture war
Dominion theology
Heaven's Gate
Jesus Movement
Jim Jones
New Apostolic Reformation
Prosperity theology

References
Notes 

Bibliography
 Balmer, Randall. Religion in Twentieth Century America (2001)
 Balmer, Randall, and Mark Silk, eds. Religion and Public Life in the Middle Atlantic Region: Fount of Diversity. (Lanham: AltaMira, 2006. 184 pp. .)
 Barlow, Philip, and Mark Silk, eds. Religion and Public Life in the Midwest: America's Common Denominator? (Lanham: AltaMira, 2004. 208 pp. .)
 Bednarowski, Mary Farrell. New Religions and the Theological Imagination in America. Indiana U. Press, 1989. 175 pp.' looks at Scientology, Unification Church, and New Age religion
 Blumhofer, Edith L., and Randall Balmer. Modern Christian Revivals (1993)
 Fogel, Robert William. The Fourth Great Awakening & the Future of Egalitarianism, (2000) excerpts
 Gallagher, Eugene V., and W. Michael Ashcraft, eds., Introduction to New and Alternative Religions in America Vol. 1: History and Controversies, xvi, 333 pp. Vol. 2: Jewish and Christian Traditions, xvi, 255 pp. Vol. 3: Metaphysical, New Age, and Neopagan Movements, xvi, 279 pp. Vol. 4: Asian Traditions, xvi, 243 pp. Vol. 5: African Diaspora Traditions and Other American Innovations, xvi, 307 pp. (Greenwood, 2006. /set.)
 Houck, Davis W., and David E. Dixon, eds. Rhetoric, Religion, and the Civil Rights Movement, 1954–1965. (Baylor University Press, 2006. xvi, 1002 pp. .)
 Keller, Rosemary Skinner, Rosemary Radford Ruether, and Marie Cantlon, eds. Encyclopedia of Women And Religion in North America (3 vol 2006 excerpt and text search
 McClymond, Michael, ed. Encyclopedia of Religious Revivals in America. (Greenwood, 2007. Vol. 1, A–Z: xxxii, 515 pp. Vol. 2, Primary Documents: xx, 663 pp. /set.)
 McLoughlin, William G. Revivals, Awakenings, and Reform: An Essay on Religion and Social Change in America, 1607–1977 1978.
 Killen, Patricia O'Connell, and Mark Silk, eds. Religion and Public Life in the Pacific Northwest: The None Zone (Lanham: AltaMira, 2004. 192 pp. .)
 Lindsay, D. Michael. Faith in the Halls of Power: How Evangelicals Joined the American Elite (2007)
 Lindsey, William, and Mark Silk, eds. Religion and Public Life in the Southern Crossroads: Showdown States. (Lanham: AltaMira, 2004. 160 pp. .)
 Roof, Wade Clark, and Mark Silk, eds. Religion and Public Life in the Pacific Region: Fluid Identities. (Lanham: AltaMira, 2005. 192 pp. .)
 Shipps, Jan, and Mark Silk, eds. Religion and Public Life in the Mountain West: Sacred Landscapes in Transition. (Lanham: AltaMira, 2004. 160 pp. .)
 Synan, Vinson. The Holiness-Pentecostal Tradition: Charismatic Movements in the Twentieth Century. (2nd ed. 1997). 340 pp.
 Walsh, Andrew, and Mark Silk, eds. Religion and Public Life in New England: Steady Habits Changing Slowly. (Lanham: AltaMira, 2004. 160 pp. .)
 Wilson, Charles Reagan, and Mark Silk, eds. Religion and Public Life in the South: In the Evangelical Mode. (Lanham: AltaMira, 2005. 232 pp. .)

Christian new religious movements
Christian revivals
Christian terminology
History of Christianity in the United States
Jesus movement
20th-century Protestantism